Karicharakadavu is a small village in Andoorkonam Panchayat, situated to the north around 8.5 km from Kazhakuttom town and around 4 km from Kaniyapuram.

It is situated on the banks of the "Parvathyputhenaar"- a canal constructed by the "Duraay" - a term for the "Pathan contractors", who were part of Tipu Sultan's Military and had settled in Kerala during the reign of HE Marthanda Varma.  The "Duraay", traditionally warriors on horseback were sent in by Tipu Sulthan to assist HE Marthanda Varma in controlling the internal rebellion that was taking place during the pre-independence time.

The pathans or the Dekhini Muslims - residents of this small village are descendants of the "Duraay" and speak Urdu at homes.  Traditionally a coir business belt which has dwindled over the years as coir prices have fallen.  A coir workers welfare society operates here.

Karicharakadavu has an old Devi temple called the Karichara Bhagavathy temple, known as locally PARAKKARIKKOVIL which is believed to be around 250 years old.

References

Villages in Thiruvananthapuram district